Hyalarctia is a genus of moths in the family Erebidae. The genus was erected by Schaus in 1901.

Species
Hyalarctia bertrandi
Hyalarctia sericea
Hyalarctia tepica

References

External links

Phaegopterina
Moth genera